Talison may refer to:
Talison Minerals, defunct Australian mining company
Talison (footballer) (born 2000), Brazilian footballer